The 2017–18 Wake Forest Demon Deacons women's basketball team represents Wake Forest University during the 2017–18 NCAA Division I women's basketball season. The Demon Deacons, led by sixth year head coach Jen Hoover, were members of the Atlantic Coast Conference and play their home games at the Lawrence Joel Veterans Memorial Coliseum. They finished the season 14–17, 5–11 in ACC play in eleventh place. They defeat Pittsburgh in the first round before losing in the second round of the ACC women's tournament to Miami (FL).

Previous season
They finished the season 16–16, 6–10 in ACC play in ninth place. They lost in the second round of the ACC women's tournament to Virginia. They were invited to the Women's National Invitation Tournament where they defeated Bethune-Cookman in the first round before losing to Middle Tennessee in the second round.

Media

Wake Forest IMG Sports Network
The Wake Forest Demon Deacons IMG Sports Network will broadcast Demon Deacons games on Wake Forest All Access. You can also keep track on Twitter @WakeWBB. Post game interviews are posted on the schools YouTube Channel.

Roster

Schedule

|-
!colspan=9 style=| Non-conference regular season

|-
!colspan=9 style=| ACC regular season

|-
!colspan=9 style=| ACC Women's Tournament

See also
 2017–18 Wake Forest Demon Deacons men's basketball team

References

Wake Forest Demon Deacons women's basketball seasons
Wake Forest